Grote is a surname. Notable people with the surname include:

 Arthur Grote (1814–1886), English colonial administrator
 Augustus Radcliffe Grote (1841–1903), British entomologist
 Byron Grote (born 1948), CFO of BP
 Dennis Grote (born 1986), German footballer
 George Grote (1794–1871), English classical historian
 Gottfried Grote (1903–1976), German church musician
 Harriet Grote (1792–1878), English biographer and wife to George Grote
 Hermann Grote (ornithologist) (1882–1951), German ornithologist
 Irvine W. Grote (1898–1972), American chemist
 Jerry Grote (born 1942), American baseball player
 Jerry Grote (basketball) (born 1940), American basketball player
 John Grote (1813–1866), English philosopher and clergyman
 Klaus Grote (born 1947), German archaeologist
 Kurt Grote (born 1973), American Olympic swimmer
 Otto Grote zu Schauen (1636–1693), a Hanoverian statesman
 Royal U. Grote, Jr. (born 1946), American Episcopalian bishop

See also